Trochetiopsis ebenus, the dwarf ebony or Saint Helena ebony, is a species of flowering plant that is endemic to the island of Saint Helena in the southern Atlantic Ocean.  It is not related to the ebony of commerce (Diospyros spp.), but is instead a member of the mallow family, Malvaceae. Saint Helena ebony is now critically endangered in the wild, being reduced to two wild individuals on a cliff, but old roots are sometimes found washed out of eroding slopes (relicts of its former abundance). These are collected on the island a used for inlay work, an important craft on Saint Helena. A related species, Trochetiopsis melanoxylon is now completely extinct.

It can be propagated from cuttings and many island gardens now boast a fine ebony bush. It is related to the Saint Helena redwood (Trochetiopsis erythroxylon) and a hybrid between them (Trochetiopsis × benjamini) is also now often planted. Trochetiopsis ebenus has staminodes that are dark maroon or "black".

See also
 Flora of Saint Helena

References

 Cronk, Q.C.B. (1995) The endemic Flora of St Helena. Anthony Nelson Ltd., Oswestry.

External links
St Helena Ebony (Royal Botanic Gardens, Kew)

ebenus
Flora of Saint Helena
Critically endangered flora of Africa